Banya may refer to:

Places

Australia 

 Banya, Queensland, a locality in the Sunshine Coast Region, Queensland, Australia

Bulgaria 

Banya, Blagoevgrad Province, a thermal spa and mountain resort in southwest Bulgaria
Banya, Burgas Province, a village in southeast Bulgaria
Banya, Pazardzhik Province, a village in the Panagyurishte municipality, Bulgaria
Banya, Plovdiv Province, a town in southern Bulgaria
Constantine's Banya, an old name variant of the city of Kyustendil, Bulgaria

Romania 

Bánya, the Hungarian name for Bănia Commune, Caraş-Severin County, Romania

Other 

Banya (sauna), a traditional Russian steam bath
BanYa, a South Korean musical group
Banya: The Explosive Delivery Man, a comic by Kim Young-oh
Banya, an honorific for royalty and nobility in Burmese names
Banya, mother of the 14th-century King U of Goryeo

See also 
 Bania (disambiguation)
 Banyan (disambiguation)